This is a list of the honours won by football clubs in São Tomé and Príncipe. It lists every association football club in São Tomé and Príncipe to have won any of the trophies both at the national and the regional level.  Santomean clubs never won any major official African competition.

Honours table

National

Since independence
It lists every Santomean association football club to have won any of the major domestic trophies, the São Tomé and Príncipe Championship, the São Tomé and Príncipe Cup and the São Tomé and Príncipe Super Cup.

Overall
It lists the overall honours won before independence of 1975 and since independence.

Regional
It lists every regional football club to have won any of the minor domestic trophies, the Championship, and the Cup of each of the two islands.

Príncipe

São Tomé

External links
Rec.Sport.Soccer Statistics Foundation

Sao Tome Principe by honours won
Football clubs in São Tomé and Príncipe
Football clubs